Princess Estelle of Sweden, Duchess of Östergötland (Estelle Silvia Ewa Mary; born 23 February 2012) is the elder child of Crown Princess Victoria and Prince Daniel, Duke of Västergötland. She is the eldest grandchild of King Carl XVI Gustaf, and is second in line of succession to the Swedish throne, after her mother.

Birth
Estelle was born to Crown Princess Victoria and Prince Daniel at 04:26 CET on 23 February 2012 at the Karolinska University Hospital in Solna. The birth was greeted by two 21-gun salutes on the island Skeppsholmen, opposite the Royal Palace in the capital Stockholm. Her names and title were announced on 24 February 2012 by her grandfather King Carl XVI Gustaf at a cabinet meeting. After the cabinet meeting, a Te Deum was held in the palace's royal chapel. Prior to the official announcement of her name and title, an error resulted in the royal website displaying the incorrect name and title – Ulrika Marianna Annika David, Duchess of Upplands Väsby, which was later removed. The staff eventually revealed the reason was that they were testing the system.

Estelle was baptised on 22 May 2012 at the Royal Chapel of Stockholm Palace in Stockholm, Sweden. Archbishop Anders Wejryd conducted the ceremony. Her godparents were her maternal uncle, Prince Carl Philip of Sweden; her paternal aunt, Anna Westling-Söderström; Willem-Alexander, the then-Prince of Orange; Crown Princess Mary of Denmark (for whom she was given her fourth name); and Crown Prince Haakon of Norway. She was baptised in the family's antique baptismal gown, which was first worn by Prince Gustaf Adolf when he was baptised in 1906. Her name and date of the baptism were added in embroidery to the gown. On the date of the baptism, a limited-edition prayer book titled Princess Estelle's Prayerbook (Swedish: Prinsessan Estelles bönbok) was released and published.

Princess Estelle is second in the line of succession to the Swedish throne and the first female in Swedish history to be born with a right to inherit the crown that cannot be superseded by the birth of a male heir, as well as the first person in Swedish history to be born of a female heir apparent. The only two princesses of Sweden to be born first in line for the throne were heir presumptive at their birth: Christina (who eventually became queen regnant) and Hedwig Sophia (who was superseded by a younger brother).

Education and royal functions
As second in line to the Swedish throne, she has been in the public eye since birth. On 17 May 2014, two-year-old Estelle inaugurated a fairytale path, named in her honour as "Duchess Estelle's Fairytale Path" in Tåkern, Östergötland. At the time of her christening, she was presented with a miniature swan and certificate to the trail indicating that in the future she would perform official engagements there. She also visited Linköping Castle, where she was received by Elisabeth Nilsson, Kristina Zetterström and Ann-Catrine Hjerdt, the mayor of Linköping.

On 25 August 2014, Estelle started preschool at Äventyret Preschool in Danderyd Municipality, Stockholm. She started to attend the Campus Manilla School in August 2018.

Titles, styles, honours and arms

Titles and styles
Estelle's full title is: Her Royal Highness Princess Estelle Silvia Ewa Mary, Duchess of Östergötland.

Honours
 : 
 Member of the Royal Order of the Seraphim (LoK av KMO) (23 February 2012, presented 22 May 2012)
 Recipient of the Commemorative Ruby Jubilee Medal of His Majesty The King (CXVIG:sJmtII) (15 September 2013)
 Recipient of the Commemorative 70th Birthday Medal of His Majesty The King (CXVIG:sJmtIII) (30 April 2016)

Arms

References

External links
Royal Court of Sweden - Princess Estelle

|-

2012 births
House of Bernadotte
Living people
Swedish princesses
Swedish people of German descent
Swedish people of Brazilian descent
Swedish people of Forest Finnish descent
Royal children
People from Solna Municipality
Dukes of Östergötland

Swedish duchesses